Fun and Frustration is a series of Indian Telugu-language comedy films. The film series is created and directed by Anil Ravipudi and distributed by Sri Venkateswara Creations. Each film starts with a fresh story unrelated with the preceding film's story. However, the theme and the pace remains the same. It is currently the twenty-second highest-grossing Indian film series worldwide.

Overview

F2:Fun and Frustration

Two young men hope to control their wives after their respective marriages. However, their chauvinistic attitude often lands them in hilarious situations.

F3:Fun and Frustration

The film will see Venkatesh Daggubati, Varun Tej, Tamannaah, and Mehreen Pirzada who reprise their roles from the previous film. The film was scheduled to release on 27 August 2021 but postponed due to the COVID-19 pandemic. It is subsequently postponed to 28 April 2022.

Films

F2: Fun and Frustration

The first installment of the series, centers on fictional incidents. Two young men hope to control their wives after their respective marriages. However, their chauvinistic attitude often lands them in hilarious situations. F2 was released in the Telugu language worldwide on 12 January 2019 coinciding with the Sankranthi weekend, and gained positive reviews from critics. The Times of India gave 3.5 out of 5 stars and said "Give it a go for Venkatesh, who saves this film from sinking into oblivion. But give it a cold hard miss if outdated humor and gender tropes are not your cups of tea." It grossed ₹7.2 crore on opening day in Andhra Pradesh and Telangana, and ₹12.9 crore worldwide. By the third weekend, the film grossed $2 million at the United States box office, and by the end of its full theatrical run, it grossed more than 127.2 crore worldwide and wound up as the fourth highest grossing film of that year. The film was dubbed into Hindi and released on YouTube 14 July 2019 by Aditya Movies. The movie already has 103 million views.

F3: Fun and Frustration

After the success of F2, Ravipudi and Raju planned a sequel. The film was titled as F3, the second installment in this series and also a stand-alone sequel to previous one. The film was scheduled to be released on 27 August 2021, but was deferred due to the COVID-19 pandemic. It is subsequently postponed to 28 April 2022 and was finally released on 27 May 2022.

Future 
After the release of F3, Ravipudi confirmed that there will be third installment in the series.

Recurring cast and characters 
This table lists the main characters who appear in the Fun And Frustration franchise.A dark grey cell indicates the character was not in the film.

Additional crew and production details

Box office

References

Indian film series
Comedy film series
Film series introduced in 2019